Anapausoides longula is a species of beetle in the family Cerambycidae, and the only species in the genus Anapausoides. It was described by Breuning in 1973.

References

Homonoeini
Beetles described in 1973